Dušan Žáček (born 8 June 1961) is a Czech former basketball player. He competed in the men's tournament at the 1980 Summer Olympics.

References

External links
 

1961 births
Living people
Czechoslovak men's basketball players
Olympic basketball players of Czechoslovakia
Basketball players at the 1980 Summer Olympics
People from Šumperk
1982 FIBA World Championship players
Czech men's basketball players
Sportspeople from the Olomouc Region